The Yakut revolt (Russian: Якутский мятеж, Yakutskiy myatezh) or the Yakut expedition (Russian: Якутский поход, Yakutskiy pokhod) was the last episode and final set of military engagements of the Russian Civil War. The hostilities took place between September 1921 and June 1923 and were centred on the Ayano-Maysky District of the Russian Far East.

A formidable rising flared up in this part of Yakutia in September 1921. About 200 White Russians were led by Cornet Mikhail Korobeinikov. In March 1922 they established the Provisional Yakut Regional People's Government in Churapcha. On 23 March Korobeinikov's "Yakut People's Army," armed with six machine guns, took the major town of Yakutsk. The Red Army garrison was decimated.

In April, the White Russians contacted the Provisional Priamurye Government in Vladivostok, asking for help. On 27 April, the Soviets declared the Yakut ASSR and sent an expedition to put down the uprising. In summer 1922, the Whites were ousted from Yakutsk and withdrew to the Pacific coast. They occupied the port towns of Okhotsk and Ayan and again asked Vladivostok for reinforcements.

On 30 August, the Pacific Ocean Fleet, crewed by about 750 volunteers under Lieutenant General Anatoly Pepelyayev, sailed from Vladivostok to assist the White Russians. Three days later, this force disembarked in Ayan and moved upon Yakutsk. By the end of October, when Pepelyayev occupied the locality of Nelkan, he learned that the Bolsheviks had wrested Vladivostok from the White Army and the Civil War was over.

When the Soviet Union was formed on 30 December 1922, the only Russian territory still controlled by the White movement was the region of the Pepelyayevshchina ("пепеляевщина"), that is, Ayan, Okhotsk, and the area around Nelkan, along with the loosely held Kamchatka Peninsula. A unit of Bolsheviks under Ivan Strod was sent against Pepelyayev and his army in Yakutia in February. On 12 February, they defeated the Pepelyayevists near Sasyl-Sasyg. Although a second attack to retake Yaktusk was ordered by Pepelyayev, his force was unsuccessful in retaking the city, and was forced to fall back. in March the White Army was ousted from Amga. This Defeat caused any remaining organization within the White Army to be shattered, as the final surviving couple hundred soldiers fell back southeast of Nelkan.

On 24 April 1923 the ships Stavropol and Indigirka sailed from Vladivostok for Ayan. They contained a contingent of the Red Army under Stepan Vostretsov. Upon his arrival in Ayan on 6 April, Vostretsov learnt that Pepelyayev had fallen back to Nelken, and then followed his army back to the coast of the Sea of Okhotsk. The remainder of the White Army gathered in the town of Okhotsk and Ayan, and held out until June where they were defeated on June 6th in Okhotsk and June and June 16th in Ayan, marking the final end to fighting in the Russian Civil War. In summary, 103 White officers and 230 soldiers were taken prisoner and transported to Vladivostok. Pepelyayev himself, would be captured after the battle of Ayan, where he would be sent to the gulag camps until 1936, and then later executed in 1938.

References
 
 
 
 
 

Anti-Bolshevik uprisings
Rebellions in Russia
Sakha Republic
Khabarovsk Krai
Conflicts in 1922
Conflicts in 1923
20th-century rebellions
1921 in Russia
1922 in the Soviet Union
1923 in the Soviet Union
1921 in Asia
1922 in Asia
1923 in Asia
Rebellions in the Soviet Union
History of the Russian Far East
Military history of the Arctic